The Church of the Holy Archangels is a Romanian Orthodox church located at 7 Garofiței Street in Focșani, Romania. It is dedicated to the Archangels Michael and Gabriel.

The church was built between 1744 and 1746. It is listed as a historic monument by Romania's Ministry of Culture and Religious Affairs.

Notes

Religious buildings and structures in Focșani
Historic monuments in Vrancea County
Romanian Orthodox churches in Vrancea County
Churches completed in 1746